The British and World Marbles Championship is a marbles knock-out tournament that takes place annually on Good Friday and dates back to 1588. It is held at the Greyhound public house in Tinsley Green, West Sussex. Teams of six players participate to win the title and a silver trophy. The event is open to anyone of any age or nationality. Over the years, players from Australia, Belgium, Canada, Estonia, Ireland, France, Germany, Japan, Netherlands, Wales and the United States have participated alongside English teams.

Both the 2020 and 2021 events were cancelled due to the COVID-19 pandemic. However, the championship successfully returned on 15 April 2022, after a three year lay-off. The next British and World Marbles Championship will be held on Bank Holiday Good Friday April 7th, 2023.

History 

The tournament dates back to 1588 during the reign of Elizabeth I, when marbles was chosen as the deciding game of a legendary sporting encounter between two young suitors, Giles and Hodge, over the hand of a Tinsley Green milk maiden named Joan. Every popular sport of the day was played in an Olympic style contest lasting one week. Hodge had been victorious at singlestick, backsword, quarter staff, cudgel play, wrestling and cock throwing, while Giles had won at archery, cricket-a-wicket, tilting at quintain (jousting targets), Turk's head, stoolball and tipcat. With the score level at 6–6, Good Friday was the date chosen for the final event. Marbles was chosen by the girl to be the deciding game, and Giles defeated Hodge.

Marble tournaments have purportedly been played at Tinsley Green since the late 1500s, until the launching of the current event in 1932. Local historians have concluded that around that time, many individual county marble championships were amalgamated to create the British Marble Championships, which was only renamed as the British and World Marbles Championship for the first time in 1938.

Rules, marble "jargon" and tactics

The championships are organized by the British Marbles Board of Control (BMBC) and the version of marbles played is Ring Taw, known in the United States as "Ringer"  and in Germany as "Englisches Ringspiel". Forty-nine target marbles are grouped closely together in 6-foot diameter (1.8-metre) raised concrete ring covered with sand, each of the target marbles being a coloured glass or ceramic sphere having a diameter of approximately 12mm (half an inch).

Two teams of six players of any age, gender or skill level, take turns using the tip of the finger to aim and project the "tolley", a larger marble (commonly referred to as the "shooter" or "taw"), which is a glass or ceramic sphere of 18mm diameter (three-quarters of an inch), deploying top spin, back spin and side spin, to drive other marbles out of the ring.

A player's knuckle must be touching the ground when shooting, known as "knuckling down". Moving the tolley closer to the target marbles, known as "cabbaging", is forbidden - as is any other advantageous movement of a players shooting hand during shooting. These would constitute a foul known as "fudging". Any intentional or persistent contact between a player's clothing and a marble or tolley while it is motion would be a foul called "blocking". No score results from a foul shot. A foul shot ends the turn of the offending player, though the score achieved in that turn stands. Any player who makes three foul shots during a game is eliminated from that game. The first team to knock out 25 marbles from the ring is the winner.

Historical timeline 

1588 – Giles defeated Hodge at marbles to claim the hand of a local young maiden of Tinsley Green.
1888 – Sam Spooner wins the title on the 300th year of the event (as British Pathé video 1938).
1932 – The Black Horse from Hookwood, were the first winners of the modern event.
1935 – 6-foot concrete ring used for the first time 
1938 - British Marbles Championship renamed as the "British and World Marbles Championship".
1942–1945 – No tournaments took place due to World War II.
March 1951 – The coldest recorded conditions for tournament when the Tinsley Green Tigers beat the Arundel Mullets in the final.
April 1962 – Glass marbles were used for the first time in place of older clay marbles.
March 1970 – Controversially the BMBC banned women from the main tournament because of the wearing of mini-skirts.
April 1973 – Len Smith of the Toucon Terribles wins a record (and still unbeaten) 12th individual title.
March 1975 – Snow had to be swept from the ring in temperatures of −2 °C. The "Terribles" win a record 19th title.
April 1977 – The tournament was moved to the Crawley Leisure Centre for one single time.
April 1987 – A Trophy was introduced for "the women's best individual player" and won by Jackie Hodge.
Sept 14th 1987 - Black Dog boozers enter Guinness World Records for ring clearance (2 mins 56 seconds) for BBC's Record Breakers.
1989 and 1991 – Highest number of teams ever entered, 28 teams of six totalling 168 players competing.
March 1992 – The TennKy Sharpshooters from Tennessee and Kentucky are the first overseas team to win the trophy.
March 1994 – Blue target marbles were used for the first and only time.
April 2000 – Team USA won the international Fen Cup with a team made up almost entirely of shooters under the age of 18.
April 2002 – Saxonia Globe Snippers become the first German team to win the tournament.
September 2008 - the Greyhound Pub, in Tinsley Green closed, only re-opening shortly before the next tournament.
April 2010 – Jen McGowan (formerly Jen LeBon) sets the standard for the ladies with a twelfth individual title.
March 2013 – Crawley-based Black Dog Boozers win the tournament for a 13th time, just 6 off the record of 19 set in 1975.
March 2018 – The Johnson Jets set the record for being runners up 11 times, having won the tournament just twice.
April 2019 – 1st MC Erzgebirge's victory means German teams have won the tournament on eleven occasions.
April 2019 – Black Dog Boozers reach the final a 20th time, equalling the achievement by Telcon/Toucon Terribles.
2020 and 2021 – Events cancelled due to COVID-19 pandemic.
July 2021 - Sad loss of Sam McCarthy-Fox, long time organiser of the event and ambassador of the game of marbles for over forty years.
15 April 2022 - The event returned to The Greyhound after three years, organised by Julia McCarthy-Fox.
15 April 2022 - Black Dog Boozers reach the final for a record breaking 21st time.

Championship results (1932 onwards)

Roll of honour

Celebrity involvement 
 1937 – Stanelli – Irish-born British musician, composer and comic entertainer and radio presenter 
 1947 – Laurel and Hardy – Comedy double act 
 1948 – Jack Warner (actor) – English film and television actor (Dixon of Dock Green) 
 1964 – Jackie Rae – Television presenter (The Golden Shot host)
 1974 – Tricia Ingrams – TV news presenter (Capital Radio/ITN/Thames News)
 1976 – Dave Allen – Irish comedian
 1980–2000s – Chris Tarrant – TV & Radio presenter (Tiswas, Who Wants to 
Be a Millionaire? and Capital Radio Host)
 1980–2000s – Tom Watt – Actor (Lofty from EastEnders) and Radio sports journalist
 2003 - Chris Packham - BBC TV presenter for Inside Out (and various TV nature programmes).
 2009 – Rory McGrath – Comedian and writer and captain on They Think It's All Over (TV series) 
 2009 – Paddy McGuinness – Comedian and TV presenter of Take Me Out (UK game show)
 2015 – Henning Wehn – German comedian on Germany winning the World Marbles Championship (at 2 mins 40 seconds)
 2021 - Marbles was chosen as an event in the popular Netflix survival drama Squid Game.

References

External links 
 Greyhound Marbles Website archive by Sam McCarthy-Fox
 Zen Marbles

External video links 
 1938 British and World Marbles championship video preview by British Pathé
 1941 British and World Marbles championship video preview by British Pathé
 1962 British and World Marbles championship video preview by British Pathé
 2008 British and World Marbles championship video by YouTube
 2011 British and World Marbles championship video by YouTube
 2013 British and World Marbles championship video by YouTube
 2015 British and World Marbles championship video by BYN TV News on YouTube
 2015 British and World Marbles championship video by World Wide weird on YouTube
 2016 British and World Marbles championship video by Britclip on YouTube
 2017 British and World Marbles championship video by Trans World Sport on YouTube
 2018 British and World Marbles championship video by Britclip on YouTube
 2019 British and World Marbles championship video by Britclip on YouTube

Pub games
Marbles
Annual events in the United Kingdom
Sport in West Sussex
Recurring events established in 1932
Spring traditions